The Washington Before Boston Medal was the first medal commissioned by the Continental Congress and, being struck in gold, is the first Congressional Gold Medal.

On March 25, 1776, Congress passed a resolution which read:

Resolved, That the thanks of this Congress, in their own name, and in the name of the thirteen United Colonies, whom they represent, be presented to His Excellency General Washington, and the officers and soldiers under his command, for their wise and spirited conduct in the siege and acquisition of Boston; and that a medal of gold be struck in commemoration of this great event, and presented to His Excellency; and that a committee of three be appointed to prepare a letter of thanks and a proper device for the medal.

Pierre-Simon-Benjamin Duvivier was commissioned to design and engrave the medal. Creating a medal during the American Revolutionary War was not a priority, and the medal was eventually struck in Paris and presented to Washington on March 21, 1790. The medal is currently possessed by the Boston Public Library.

References

 

Monuments and memorials to George Washington in the United States
Awards established in 1776
George Washington in art
Horses in art